The Fifty-seventh Oklahoma Legislature was a meeting of the legislative branch of the government of Oklahoma, composed of the Senate and the House of Representatives. It met in Oklahoma City, Oklahoma from January 3, 2019, to January 3, 2021, during the first two years of the first administration of Governor Kevin Stitt. The November 2018 elections maintained Republican control of both the House and Senate.

Dates of sessions
Organizational day: January 3, 2019
First Session: February 4, 2019 - May 23, 2019
Previous: 56th Legislature • Next: 58th Legislature

Major legislation

First Session
In the First Session, the Legislature enacted 516 bills, including the following:

Guns - HB2597 established permit-less carry of concealed and unconcealed firearms for all Oklahomans over the age 21
Government Reform - HB2479 granted the Governor the authority to directly hire and fire the Director of the Oklahoma Office of Juvenile Affairs
Government Reform - HB2480 granted the Governor the authority to directly hire and fire the Director of the Oklahoma Department of Corrections
Government Reform - HB2483 granted the Governor the authority to directly hire and fire the Director of the Oklahoma Department of Mental Health and Substance Abuse Services
Government Reform - SB456 granted the Governor the authority to directly hire and fire the Director of the Oklahoma Health Care Authority
Government Reform - SB457 granted the Governor the authority to directly hire and fire the Director of the Oklahoma Department of Transportation
Medical Marijuana - HB2612 enacted the Medical Marijuana and Patient Protection Act to regular medical marijuana in Oklahoma
Highways - HB1071 increased speed limit to 80 miles per hour on state turnpikes and to 75 miles per hour on state highways
Hemp - SB868 authorizing the Oklahoma Department of Agriculture, Food, and Forestry to oversee the Oklahoma Industrial Hemp Program
State Employees - SB234 requires all non-merit state employee positions be approved by the Legislature
Attorney General - HB2751 requires all settlement proceeds collected by the Oklahoma Attorney General to be deposited into the State General Fund
Budget - HB2765 adopting the Fiscal Year 2020 state budget
Education - HB2769 repealing the annual April 1 deadline for the Legislature to fund common education
Government Reform - SB1 establishing the Legislative Office of Fiscal Transparency within the Legislature to audit state agencies
Elections - HB1259 allowing voters to take and post pictures of their marked ballot to social media
State Employees - HB2771 granted a pay raise for all State government employees

Second Session
In the Second Session, the Legislature enacted 167 bills, including the following:

Government Reform - SB661 amended the Oklahoma Open Meeting Act to allow public bodies to hold videoconference meetings in response to the COVID-19 pandemic
Government Reform - HB3870 permits the Oklahoma Commissioners of the Land Office to increase its investment in commercial real estate
Elections - SB210 allows for additional absentee voter methods in response to the COVID-19 pandemic
Transportation - HB2744 authorizes the Oklahoma Department of Transportation to issue $200 million in bonds to finance highway construction
Juvenile Justice - HB1282 prohibiting the placement of certain minor child into the custody of the Oklahoma Office of Juvenile Affairs
Crime - HB2777 criminalizes the theft or destruction of mail and packages
Education - HB2905 amends the process whereby virtual charter schools accept new students 
Crime - SB1461 criminalizes the dissemination of private sexual images 
Privacy - HB3613 prohibits any state or local agency from requiring a nonprofit organization to disclose its members and supports
State Employees - SB285 requiring State agencies to accommodate lactating mothers
Firearms - SB1081 prohibits any state agency rule or local government ordinance from  enforcing gun restrictions greater than required by state law
Tobacco - SB1428 increases the minimum age for the purchase of tobacco products from 18 to 21
State Employees - SB1424 authorizes a pay raise for employees of the Oklahoma Department of Corrections
Abortion - SB1728 allows for a wrongful death suit if an abortion provider does not perform an abortion as required by law

Leadership

Since the Republican Party holds the majority of seats in both the Oklahoma Senate and Oklahoma House of Representatives, they hold the top leadership positions in both chambers.

In Oklahoma, the lieutenant governor serves as President of the Oklahoma Senate, meaning that he serves as the presiding officer in ceremonial instances and can provide a tie-breaking vote. Todd Lamb served until January 14, 2019, Matt Pinnell was then sworn in as the current Lieutenant Governor of Oklahoma. The current President pro tempore of the Oklahoma Senate, who presides over the state senate on the majority of session days is Greg Treat of Oklahoma City. He is aided by Majority Floor Leader Kim David of Porter. The Democratic minority leader of the state senate is Kay Floyd of Oklahoma City. Paul Ziriax serves as the Secretary of the Oklahoma Senate.

The Oklahoma House of Representatives is led by Speaker Charles McCall of Atoka. He is aided by Majority Floor Leader Jon Echols of Oklahoma City. The Democratic minority leader is Emily Virgin of Norman. Joel Kintsel serves as Chief Clerk of the Oklahoma House of Representatives.

Membership

Changes in membership during session
January 31, 2020	Jason Smalley (R) resigned from SD-28 to accept a private sector position.
August 4, 2020 Zack Taylor (R) assumed office to fill SD-28 vacated by Jason Smalley.
December 31, 2020 Stephanie Bice (R) resigned from SD-22 to represent Oklahoma's 5th congressional district, leaving the seat vacant and triggering a 2021 special election.

Senate

Overview

Leadership
Senate Leadership

Majority Leadership

Minority Leadership

Committee Leadership

Members

†Elected in a special election

Committees

House

Overview

Leadership
House Leadership

Majority Leadership

Minority Leadership

Members

Committees

References

External links
 Oklahoma Legislature Homepage
 State of Oklahoma's Website
 Legislative Bill Tracking Website

Oklahoma legislative sessions
2019 in Oklahoma
2020 in Oklahoma
2019 U.S. legislative sessions
2020 U.S. legislative sessions